Ernest Blanc-Garin or Ernest-Stanislas Blanc-Garin (8 October 1843 – 1916) was a French painter.

Blanc-Garin was born in Givet on 8 October 1843. He studied at the Académie Royale des Beaux-Arts in Brussels. He trained many student in his workshop in Brussels.

Blanc-Garin died in Brussels in 1916.

Blanc-Garin's students
Blanc-Garin's students include:

Gallery

References

External links

1843 births
1916 deaths
People from Givet
19th-century French painters
20th-century French painters